The British Independent Film Award for Best International Independent Film is an annual award given by the British Independent Film Awards (BIFA) to recognize the best international independent films. The award was first presented in the 1998 ceremony.

From 1998 to 2002, two categories named Best Foreign Independent Film – English Language and Best Foreign Independent Film – Foreign Language were presented, in 2003 both categories were merged into the current category.

In 2012 the category was renamed to its current name, previously the category was named Best Foreign Independent Film.

Winners and nominees

1990s

2000s

 Best Foreign Independent Film

2010s

2020s

References

External links
 Official website

British Independent Film Awards
BIFA Award